2020 MUAHS Guild Awards
February 16, 2019

Contemporary: 

Bombshell

Bombshell

Period/Character:

Joker

Downton Abbey
The 2020 Make-Up Artists and Hair Stylists Guild Awards, honoring the best make-up and hairstyling in film and television for 2019, the winners were announced on February 16, 2020 while the nominees were announced on January 10, 2020.

Winners and nominees

Feature-Length Motion Picture

Best Contemporary Make-Up 

 Bombshell – Vivian Baker, Cristina Waltz, Richard Redlefsen 
 Avengers: Endgame – John Blake, Francisco Perez
 Hustlers – Margot Boccia, Roxanne Rizzo
 John Wick: Parabellum – Stephen M. Kelley, Anna Stachow
 Us – Scott Wheeler, Tym Shutchai Buacharern, Sabrina Castro

 Best Contemporary Hair Styling 

 Bombshell – Anne Morgan, Jaime Leigh McIntosh, Adruitha Lee 
 Hustlers – Angel De Angelis, Dierdre Harris
 John Wick: Parabellum – Kerrie Smith, Therese Ducey
 Joker – Kay Georgiou, Vanessa Anderson
 The Laundromat – Marie Larkin, Yvette Stone, J. Roy Helland

 Best Period and/or Character Make-Up 

 Joker – Nicki Ledermann, Tania Ribalow, Sunday Englis Dolemite Is My Name – Vera Steimberg, Debra Denson, Deborah Huss-Humphries
 Downton Abbey – Anne Nosh Oldham, Elaine Browne, Sam Smart
 Once Upon a Time in Hollywood – Heba Thorisdottir, Gregory Funk
 Rocketman – Lizzie Yianni Georgiou, Tapio Salmi, Laura Solari

 Best Period and/or Character Hair Styling 

 Downton Abbey – Anne Nosh Oldham, Elaine Browne, Marc Pilcher
 Dolemite Is My Name – Carla Joi Farmer, Stacey Morris, Linda Villalobos
 Maleficent: Mistress of Evil – Audrey Futterman-Stern
 Once Upon a Time in Hollywood – Janine Rath-Thompson, Michelle Diamantides
 Rocketman – Lizzie Yianni Georgiou, Tapio Salmi, Laura Solari

Best Special Make-Up Effects 

 Bombshell – Kazu Hiro, Vivian Baker, Richard Redlefsen
 Captain Marvel – Brian Sipe, Alexei Dmitiew, Sabrina Wilson
 The Irishman – Mike Marino, Mike Fontaine, Carla White
 It Chapter Two – Sean Sansom, Shane Zander, Iantha Goldberg
 Rocketman – Barrie Gower, Lizzie Yianni Georgiou, Victoria Money

Television Series, Miniseries or New Media Series

Best Contemporary Make-Up
Big Little Lies – Michelle Radow, Erin Good-Rosenmann
Euphoria – Doniella Davy, Kirsten Coleman
Grace and Frankie – Melissa Sandora, David DeLeon, Bonita DeHaven
Russian Doll – Amy L. Forsythe, Heidi Pakdel, Danielle Minnella
The Handmaid's Tale – Burton LeBlanc, Alastair Muir, Faye Crasto

Best Contemporary Hair Styling
Big Little Lies - Jose Zamora, Lorena Zamora, Lona Vigi
Black-ish – Araxi Lindsey, Enoch Williams
Empire – Melissa Forney, Al Payne, Nolan Kelly
Grace and Frankie – Kelly Kline, Jonathan Hanousek, Marlene Williams
The Handmaid's Tale – Paul Elliot, Ewa Latak-Cynk

Best Period and/or Character Make-Up
Fosse/Verdon – Debbie Zoller, Dave Presto, Jackie Risotto
American Horror Story: 1984 – Carleigh Herbert, Michael Mekash, Abby Clawson
Chernobyl – Daniel Parker, Natasha Nikolic-Dunlop
Game of Thrones – Jane Walker, Kay Bilk
GLOW – Lana Horochowski, Maurine Burke

Best Period and/or Character Hair Styling
Fosse/Verdon – Christopher Fulton, Christen Edwards, Christine Cantrell
American Horror Story: 1984 – Michelle Ceglia, Analyn Cruz, Taschi Lynell
Chernobyl – Daniel Parker, Julio Parodi, Bozena Maise Jenko
GLOW – Theraesa Rivers, Valerie Jackson
Pose – Barry Lee Moe, Timothy Harvey, Sabana Majeed

Best Special Make-Up Effects
Chernobyl – Daniel Parker, Barrie Gower, Paul Spateri
American Horror Story: 1984 – Michael Mekash, Vincent Van Dyke, Carleigh Herbert
Fosse/Verdon – Debbie Zoller, Vincent Van Dyke, Dave Presto
Game of Thrones – Barrie Gower, Sarah Gower
Star Trek: Discovery – Glen Hetrick, James MacKinnon, Rocky Faulkner

Motion Picture for Television or Special

Best Contemporary Make-Up
Saturday Night Live – Louie Zakarian, Amy Tagliamonti, Jason Milani
American Idol – Tonia Green, Gina Ghiglieri, Michelle Chung
Dancing with the Stars – Julie Socash, Alison Gladieux, Donna Bard
So You Think You Can Dance – Tonia Green, Silvia Leczel, Alison Gladieux
World of Dance – Tonia Green, Danielle Rush

Best Contemporary Hair Styling
Dancing with the Stars – Mary Guerrero, Kimi Messina, Gail Ryan
America's Got Talent – Dean Banowetz, Ryan Randall, Cory Rotenberg
So You Think You Can Dance – Dean Banowetz, Melanie Verkins, Ryan Randall
The Voice – Jerilynn Stephens, Meagan Herrera-Schaaf, Amber Maher
World of Dance – Dean Banowetz, Meagan Herrera-Schaaf, Cory Rotenberg

Best Period and/or Character Make-Up
Saturday Night Live – Louie Zakarian, Amy Tagliamonti, Jason Milani
Deadwood: The Movie – Lana Horochowski, Maurine Burke, Lesa Nielsen Duff
Live in Front of a Studio Audience: Norman Lear's "All in the Family" and "The Jefferson's" – Patty Bunch, Farah Bunch
Patsy & Loretta – Jori Jenae McGuire, Julie Callihan, Laura Godwin
Rent: Live – Zena Shteysel Green, Angela Moos, Donna Bard

Best Period and/or Character Hairstyling
Deadwood: The Movie – Melissa Yonkey, Laine Trzinski, Jose Zamora
Live in Front of a Studio Audience: Norman Lear's "All in the Family" and "The Jefferson's" – Tim Burke, Pixie Schwartz, Conrad Hilton
Patsy & Loretta – Yvette Stone, Teresa Morgan
Rent: Live – Barry Lee Moe, April Schuller, Erica Adams

Best Special Make-Up Effects
Saturday Night Live – Louie Zakarian, Jason Milani, Tom Denier Jr.
2019 MTV Video Music Awards – Angelique Velez, Kyle Krueger
6 Underground – Jana Carboni, Leonardo Cruciano
Celebrity Big Brother – Tyson Fountaine, Brian Penikas, Scott Wheeler
Paddleton – Vyvy Tran

Daytime Television

Best Make-Up
The Real – Melanie Mills, Uzmee Krakovszki, Motoko Honjo-Clayton
The Bold and the Beautiful – Christine Lai Johnson, Chris Escobosa, Stacey Alfano
Dr. Phil – Cool Benson, Alan Bosshardt, Christina Patch
The Price Is Right – Carol Wood
The Young and the Restless – Patricia Denney, Kathy Jones, Laura Schaffer Holmes

Best Hairstyling
The Real - Roberta Gardener-Rogers, Noogie Thai, Ray Dodson
Dr. Phil – Mimi Vodnoy-Love, Annette Jones
The Bold and the Beautiful – Lisa Long, Danielle Spencer, Lauren Larsen
The Young and the Restless – Adriana Lucio, Regina Rodriquez, Lauren Mendoza

Children and Teen Television Programming

Best Make-Up
A Series of Unfortunate Events – Rita Ciccozzi, Tanya Hudson, Krista Seller
All That – Michael Johnston, Melanie Mills, Allan Apone
Henry Danger – Michael Johnston, Patti Brand-Reese, Brad Look
Just Add Magic – Myriam Arougheti, Merry Lee Traum
No Good Nick – Myriam Arougheti, Merry Lee Traum, Jacklynn Evans

Best Hairstyling
A Series of Unfortunate Events – Julie McHaffie, Dianne Holme
All That – Joe Matke, Dwayne Ross, Roma Goddard
Fuller House – Anna Maria Orzano, Sandra Munk
Malibu Rescue – Pavy Olivarez, Monique Hyman, Laura Caponera
Lip Sync Battle Shorties – Jerilynn Stephens, Kathleen Leonard, Cory Rotenberg

Commercials and Music Videos

Best Make-Up
Pose: Promo Campaign – Kerry Herta, Sherri Lawrence
All That – Michael Johnston, Melanie Mills, Brad Look
Botched: Season 6 Promo – Jason Collins, Carlton Coleman, Michael McCarty
GEICO: "A Witch for a Third Roommate" – Dominie Till, Pepe Mora
Spectrum Communications "Warehouse The 'Good/Evil'" Ad Campaign – Edward French, Kevin Haney, Bruce Fuller

Best Hairstyling
Pose: Promo Campaign – Joe Matke, Fernando Navarro, Barry Lee Moe
Budweiser - Reserve Copper Lager Commercial – Enzo Angileri
Something Amazing – Craig Gangi, Naomi Bakstad
Weird Al Yankovic: Press Promo-Off Camera with Sam Jones – Sean James Cummins

Theatrical Production

Best Make-Up
Cats – Jakey Hicks, Sierra Peterson
Into the Woods – Vanessa Dionne, Donna Levy, Jeff Knaggs
La bohème – Darren Jinks, Brandi Strona
Reefer Madness – Michael Johnston, Fernando Navarro, Lauren Lillien
Sweeney Todd: The Demon Barber of Fleet Street – Sharon Peng, Raven Winter

Best Hairstyling
Hamilton – Charles LaPointe, Daryl Terry
Cats – Jakey Hicks, Sierra Peterson, Chanthy Tach
Into the Woods – Vanessa Dionne, Stephanie Fenner, Jeff Knaggs
La bohème – Darren Jinks, Raquel Bianchini, Linda Cardenas
Sweeney Todd: The Demon Barber of Fleet Street – Sharon Peng, Raven Winter

References

2019